Gabriele Löwe ( Kotte; born 12 December 1958, in Dresden) is a retired East German sprinter who specialised in the 400 metres.

At the 1980 Summer Olympics in Moscow she finished sixth in the 400 metres and won a silver medal in the women's  4 × 400 metres relay with her teammates Barbara Krug, Christina Brehmer and Marita Koch.

She competed for the club SC Einheit Dresden during her active career.

External links

1958 births
Living people
East German female sprinters
Athletes (track and field) at the 1980 Summer Olympics
Olympic athletes of East Germany
Olympic silver medalists for East Germany
Dresdner SC athletes
Athletes from Dresden
Medalists at the 1980 Summer Olympics
Olympic silver medalists in athletics (track and field)
Olympic female sprinters